Tropic Thunder: Original Motion Picture Score was released on August 5, 2008 by Lakeshore Records. The score was composed by Theodore Shapiro and performed by the Hollywood Studio Symphony.

Reviews
William Ruhlmann of Allmusic gave the score a positive review, stating it is "...an affectionate and knowing satire of the history of Hollywood action movie music, penned by an insider." Thomas Simpson of SoundtrackNet called it "...a mixture of fun, seriousness, rock n' roll and great scoring."

Track listing

References

External links
 

Film scores